is a Japanese gravure idol. She is from Tokyo, and was a first year member (#7) of the idol group Idoling!!!. On December 11, 2011 it was announced that she would graduate from Idoling!!! on December 31 together with Fonchi (#8). Her nickname is 'Yaza-pai'.

Bibliography

Photographs 
 Eri Color (2007)
 No. 7 Second Yazawaa (2008)
 Yazawa no kaidan no boru (2010)

Filmography

Dramas

TV Shows 
 Idoling!!! - Idoling #7 (2006-2011)
 Kudamaki Hachibee X - (2011-)

TV Dramas 
 Tetsudou Musume - Kawaguchi Misono (2008)
 The Ancient Dogoo Girl - Role of Dogu-chan, the female lead character
 Kamen Rider W - Ai Nijimura (2010)
 Ancient Girl Squad Dogoon 5 - Role of Dogu-chan (2010)

Image Videos 
 Eri color, 2007
 Pure Smile, Yazawa Erika, 2007
 Sumimasen, Yazawa Erika kudasai, 2008
 Yazapai School, 2009
 Yazapai Tension, 2009
 Yazapai Standard, 2010
 Yazapai Teen FINAL, 2010
 Yazapai Memorial~Married, no!? , 2011

References

External links 
 https://web.archive.org/web/20100305060248/http://www.horipro.co.jp/talent/PF104/ - Agency profile
 Idoling!!! - Idol searching show where she debuted.
 Official blog
 

Japanese television personalities
Japanese gravure idols
1990 births
Living people
Idoling!!! members